Bystrzyca is a river of Poland, a left tributary of the Oder, which it meets a few kilometers north (downstream) from Wrocław.

The Bystrzyca was dammed in 1917 near the village of Lubachów to create Lake Lubachowskie, and dammed at Mietków in 1974 to create the large reservoir Zalew Mietkowski.  The river also forms the western boundary of the Owl Mountains range in the Central Sudetes.

Among its tributaries is the Strzegomka.

See also 
 Bystrzyca (disambiguation)

References 

Rivers of Poland
Rivers of Lower Silesian Voivodeship